Thetford Town Football Club is an English football club based in Thetford, Norfolk. The club is affiliated to the Norfolk County FA.

History
The club was established in 1883 and moved to its current ground on Mundford Road in 1905. They played in the Norwich and District League until World War I, but due to the town's position on the Norfolk-Suffolk border, the club could enter cups in both counties, and in 1911 were victorious in the Suffolk Junior Cup final.

After the war they played in leagues in the Norfolk & Suffolk League until becoming founder members of the Eastern Counties League in 1935. However, they finished bottom in both 1935–36 and 1936–37 and rejoined the Norfolk & Suffolk League in 1937. In 1948 they won the Norfolk Senior Cup, and after finishing as league runners-up in 1951–52, 1952–53 and 1953–54, they were league champions in 1954–55.

In 1963 the club rejoined the Eastern Counties League. However, they never finished higher than fifth, and were bottom in both 1983–84 and 1984–85. In 1989–90 the club finished as runners-up in the Premier Division. Although they won the Norfolk Senior Cup final the following season, in 1991–92 they were relegated to Division One after finishing bottom. The club finished bottom of Division One in 1998–99 and 1999–2000, but were not relegated.

In 2011–12, the club finished second behind Godmanchester Rovers on goal difference in Division One and were promoted to the Premier Division.

Thetford finished 7th in the 2016–17 season, the team's highest finish in 26 years.

The next two seasons saw Thetford finish just below mid-table, following inconsistent campaigns, however they reached a cup final in each season, firstly losing to Brantham Athletic in the Thurlow Nunn Challenge Cup, and then in the Norfolk Senior Cup final to Dereham Town.

Stadium
The club play their home games at Mundford Road, adjacent to the Breckland Leisure Centre complex.

Honours
Norfolk & Suffolk League
Champions 1954–55 
Suffolk Junior Cup
Winners 1910–11
Norfolk Senior Cup
Winners 1947–48, 1990–91

Records
Best FA Cup – performance: Second qualifying round (five times)
Best FA Vase performance: Fourth round, 1990–91
Attendance: 394 vs Diss Town, Norfolk Senior Cup, 1991

References

External links
Club website

Association football clubs established in 1883
Football clubs in England
Football clubs in Norfolk
Eastern Counties Football League
1883 establishments in England
Norfolk & Suffolk League
Thetford